Olszewnica Nowa  is a village in the administrative district of Gmina Wieliszew, within Legionowo County, Masovian Voivodeship, in east-central Poland.

The village has a population of 170.

References

Olszewnica Nowa